Isabella I most often refers to Isabella I of Castile (1451–1504).

Isabella I may also refer to:

 Isabella I of Jerusalem (1172–1205) 
 Isabella of Majorca (1337–1406)

See also 
 Elizabeth I (disambiguation)